Municipal elections were held in Rome on 16 November 1997 to elect the Mayor of Rome and 60 members of the City Council, as well as the nineteen presidents and more than 400 councillors of the 19 circoscrizioni in which the municipality was divided.

As a result, incumbent mayor Francesco Rutelli was re-elected for a second four-year term by a landslide.

Background
In the 1996 general elections the centre-left coalition led by Romano Prodi performed strongly in nearly all the urban centers across Italy and especially in the city of Rome. Since that moment the political support to leftist parties in the Eternal City started to increase heavily, although the former-fascist National Alliance (AN) continued to maintain a huge number of supporters across the city.

During the previous years, the incumbent mayor Francesco Rutelli saw his personal popularity increase among Roman citizens. During his term in office he promoted some important architectural and urban projects to redevelop the city such as the approval of Parco della Musica concert hall designed by Renzo Piano in 1994 and the urban plan called "Cento piazze" (literally "One hundred squares") in 1995, a project to renovate different squares and creating new pedestrian zones in many parts of the city, from the historical city center to the suburbs. Thanks to this plan many historical and tourist landmarks of Rome were renovated and pedestrianized such as Piazza di Spagna  (1995) and Piazza del Popolo (1997). 

As a part of his plan to renovate the city, in March 1995 Rutelli submitted an unsuccessful bid to host the 2004 Summer Olympics, which were ultimately awarded to Athens in September 1997.

Against the mayor, the centre-right Pole for Freedoms coalition initially seemed intentioned to propose the candidacy of the right-wing deputy Francesco Storace, but ultimately chose Pierluigi Borghini, a famous conservative businessman, in an attempt to gain more votes from independent and centrist voters.

Voting system
The voting system is used for all mayoral elections in Italy, in the city with a population higher than 15,000 inhabitants. Under this system voters express a direct choice for the mayor or an indirect choice voting for the party of the candidate's coalition. If no candidate receives 50% of votes, the top two candidates go to a second round after two weeks. This gives a result whereby the winning candidate may be able to claim majority support, although it is not guaranteed.

The election of the City Council is based on a direct choice for the candidate with a preference vote: the candidate with the majority of the preferences is elected. The number of the seats for each party is determined proportionally.

Parties and candidates
This is a list of the major parties (and their respective leaders) which participated in the election.

Results

Circoscrizioni election

Since 1972 the city of Rome had been divided into 20 administrative areas, called circoscrizioni (reduced to 19 in 1992 after Fiumicino became an independent comune separated from Rome). In 1997 for the first time the presidents of each circoscrizione was directly elected by citizens. No second round was needed since the candidate who received the most votes was elected president.

Table below shows the results for each circoscrizione with the percentage for each coalition:

Source: Municipality of Rome - Electoral Service

References

1997 elections in Italy
Rome
Rome
Elections in Rome
1990s in Rome
November 1997 events in Europe